Belica is a village in the municipality of Jagodina, Serbia. According to the 2002 census, the village has an estimated population of 393 residents.

References

Populated places in Pomoravlje District